This is a list of rivers of Israel. This list is arranged by drainage basin, with respective tributaries indented under each larger stream's name.

Nahal (Hebrew) and Wadi (Arabic) commonly translate to Stream, more seldom River.

Streams entirely on the West Bank are not listed here.

Mediterranean Sea
Rivers emptying into the Mediterranean Sea, listed from north to south.
Nahal Betzet (Arabic: Wadi Karkara)
Nahal Kziv (Arabic: Wadi al-Qarn)
Ga'aton River
Na'aman River (Hebrew: Nahal Na'aman, Arabic: Nahr al-Na'mein), ancient Belus River
Kishon River
 (Arabic: Wadi Abu Alhiya), formerly Nahal Nahash
Nahal Taninim (Arabic: Wadi az-Zarqa)
Hadera Stream (Arabic: Nahr Akhdar)
Nahal Alexander
Nahal Poleg (Arabic: Wadi al-Faliq)
Yarkon River
Wadi Qana or Qanah (Hebrew: Nahal Qanah)
Ayalon River (Arabic: Wadi Musrara)
 (Arabic: Wadi Amuriya)
Nahal Sorek (Arabic: Wadi al-Sarar)
Lakhish River (Arabic: Wadi Suqrir)
 or Shiqma (Arabic: Wadi el-Hesi), location of an important First World War-time battle
HaBesor Stream (Arabic: Wadi Ghazzeh/Gaza [downstream] and Wadi esh-Shallaleh [upstream])
Nahal Gerar (Arabic: Wadi esh-Sheri'a / Wady el Sharia)

Nahal Hevron (English: Hebron River or Stream, Arabic: Wadi al-Samen or Wadi al-Khalil)

Dead Sea
Rivers emptying into the Dead Sea. Tributaries of the Jordan River are listed north to south, where needed east to west.

Jordan River and its tributaries
Jordan River

From the foothills of Mount Hermon and South Lebanon
Banias River (Hebrew: Nahal Hermon)
Dan River
Hasbani River (Hebrew: Nahal Snir)
Nahal Ayun

From the Galilee to the Upper Jordan River
Nahal Dishon (Arabic: Wadi al-Hindaj)

From the Galilee to the Sea of Galilee
Nahal Korazim
Nahal Amud (Arabic: Wadi al-Amud)
 or Zalmon (Arabic: Wadi al-Rubudiyeh)
 (Arabic: Wadi al-Hamam)

From the Galilee to the Lower Jordan River
 (Arabic: Wadi Fidjdjas, sometimes spelled Fijas)
Yarmouk River
Nahal Tavor (English: Tabor Stream, Tavor Stream)

From the Valleys to the Jordan River
Harod Stream ("Nahal Harod", "Wadi Jalud" in Arabic)

The West Bank tributaries are not listed here. This concerns creeks entirely on the West Bank, from spring to the Dead Sea.

From the Judaean desert to the Dead Sea
Nahal Yishai (West Bank and Israel)
,  Wadi Sdeir (West Bank and Israel)
 (West Bank and Israel);  Arabic names: Wadi el-Jihar (upper course), Wadi el-Ghar (central section) und Wadi Areijeh (lower course)
Nahal Tsruya (West Bank and Israel)
Nahal Hever (West Bank and Israel)
Nahal Asa'el (West Bank and Israel)
Nahal Mishmar (mostly Israel)
 (Israel)
Tze'elim Stream (Israel)
 (West Bank and Israel)
 (West Bank and Israel)

From the Negev to the Dead Sea
, related to the Zin Desert

Negev to Arava Valley to the Dead Sea
Nahal HaArava

Nahal Shivya
Nahal Paran
Nahal Hiyyon

Red Sea (Gulf of Eilat)
Streams emptying into the Gulf of Eilat of the Red Sea.

 (lit. Solomon Stream)

References
Rand McNally, The New International Atlas, 1993.
 GEOnet Names Server

Israel
Rivers